The Padre Vicente Garcia Memorial Academy, also referred to as PVGMA, is a private, non-sectarian institution located in Poblacion B, Rosario, Batangas, Philippines. Established in 1946, the school currently offers STEM, HUMMS and ABM.

History 
Padre Vicente Garcia Memorial Academy was established in 1946 in honor of a Filipino priest Fr. Vicente García y Teodoro and was founded by Dr. Melecio Z. Bolaños, Crisanto A. Gualberto, Fidel Luna and Mayor Fiscal Jose P. Recto. Bolaños was the first president of the Padre Vicente Garcia Memorial Academy and succeeded by Mayor Fiscal P Recto. Bolaños named the school after the love that Padre Garcia gave to God and to country.

The Padre Vicente Garcia Memorial Academy is the first and the oldest high school that formed in Rosario, Batangas and opened first and second year classes on July 1, 1946. Talks and lectures were held at the places of Mr. Jose Maranan and Don Antonino Luancing.

After the death of Dr. Bolaños, the school was entrusted to Attorney Jose P. Recto as president, Mr. Lucio Magsino as secretary, Dr. Fidel Luna as treasurer, Dr. Gualberto I as an auditor. The building or the main school was built in 1947 and it was made of nipa and "Sawaling Pampanga" which is wood.

Academics

Basic Education Department (BED) 

 Junior High School
 Grade 7 to Grade 10
 Senior High School
 Grade 11 to Grade 12
 Academic Track:
 Accountancy, Business and Management (ABM)
 Science, Technology and Mathematics (STEM)
 Humanities and Social Sciences (HUMSS)

References

External links 

 Official website
 

Schools in Batangas
Private schools in the Philippines